Jubileumspokalen (literally: The Jubilee Trophy) or Solvallas Jubileumspokal is an annual Group One harness event for trotters that is held at Solvalla in Stockholm, Sweden. Jubileumspokalen has taken place since 1977. In 2008, the purse of the event was approximately US$281,000 (SEK1,750,000).

Origin
In 1977, Solvalla's 50th Anniversary was celebrated. To commemorate this, the new event Jubileumspokalen was inaugurated.

Racing conditions
Since the start in 1977, Jubileumspokalen has been almost exclusively over 2,140 meters (1.33 mile). In the years 1980-1982 however, the race was shorter, 1,640-1,660 meters (1.02-1.03 mile). Auto start has been used every year, with the exception of 1981, when volt start was used.

In January 2009 it was announced that Jubileumspokalen would be somewhat reformed. The 2009 edition will be the first Jubileumspokalen that is open only for 5-year-olds. Prior to 2009, the race was open for horses of age three and up.

Past winners

Horses with most wins
 3 - Zoogin (1995, 1996, 1998)
 3 - Gidde Palema (2003, 2004, 2005)
 2 - Pershing (1978, 1979)
 2 - Callit (1986, 1987)
 2 - Victory Tilly (2000, 2001)

Drivers with most wins
 9 - Stig H. Johansson
 7 - Åke Svanstedt
 4 - Örjan Kihlström
 3 - Olle Goop
 2 - Erik Adielsson
 2 - Karl O. Johansson
 2 - Berndt Lindstedt

Trainers with most wins
 11 - Stig H. Johansson
 7 - Åke Svanstedt
 3 - Stefan Melander
 2 - Stefan Hultman
 2 - Karl O. Johansson
 2 - Berndt Lindstedt

Sires with at least two winning offsprings
 2 - Scarlet Knight (Iceland, Friction)
 2 - Nevele Pride (Pershing, U.S. Thor Viking)
 2 - Super Bowl (Napoletano, Shogun Lobell)
 2 - Quick Pay (The Onion, Victory Tilly)
 2 - Tibur (Callit, Piper Cub)

Winner with lowest odds
 Winning odds: 1.07 - Pershing (1979)

Winner with highest odds
 Winning odds: 43.68 - Thai Tanic (2006)

Fastest winners

Auto start
 1:09.9 (km rate) - Readly Express (2017)

Volt start
 1:14.7 (km rate) - Zorrino (1981)

All winners of Jubileumspokalen

See also
 List of Scandinavian harness horse races

References

Harness races in Sweden